Westfield is an unincorporated community in Lewis County, in the U.S. state of West Virginia.

Westfield was founded in 1817.

References

Unincorporated communities in Lewis County, West Virginia
Unincorporated communities in West Virginia